Warren Fredrick Miller (born June 15, 1953) is an American former professional ice hockey player. He played 238 games in the World Hockey Association and 262 games in the National Hockey League between 1976 and 1983. Internationally Miller played for the American national team at the 1977 and 1981 World Championships and the 1981 Canada Cup.

Playing career
After playing for South St. Paul High School in Minnesota, Miller enrolled at the University of Minnesota where he had a four-year collegiate career. Miller helped the Golden Gophers to two NCAA championship titles in his sophomore (1974) and senior (1976) seasons while playing for Hall of Fame coach Herb Brooks.

Miller was drafted by the New York Rangers of the National Hockey League (NHL) in the 21st Round (241st overall) of the 1974 NHL Amateur Draft, and was also selected by the Vancouver Blazers of the World Hockey Association (WHA) in the 1974 WHA Amateur Draft. The Calgary Cowboys retained Miller's rights after the franchise relocated from Vancouver, and following his college career Miller elected to play with Calgary where he played 83 games in parts of two seasons with the Cowboys tallying 55 points (23 G, 32 A) before the franchise folded.

Obtained by the Edmonton Oilers prior to the 1977-78 he played 18 games scoring two goals with four assists before being traded to the Quebec Nordiques with Dave Inkpen, Rick Morris and Ken Broderick for Don McLeod and Pierre Guité. In 60 games with Quebec he had 38 points (14 goals, 24 assists).
 
Prior to the 1978-79 season Miller was traded to the New England Whalers for Jean-Louis Levasseur. In the WHA's final season he notched a career high in goals with 26 adding 23 assists for 49 points. In the NHL-WHA merger before the 1979-80 season, Miller was re-claimed during the expansion draft by the Rangers, who held his NHL rights. In one season in New York he played 55 games but had only 13 points on six goals and seven assists.

The following season he was sold back to the Hartford Whalers for cash considerations. He played the final three seasons of his career in the mall scoring 33 goals, assisting on 44 others for 77 points in his final 207 games.

Overall he played in 262 games in the NHL and 238 games in the WHA for five franchises over eight professional seasons.

International play
Miller was also a member of the American national team at the 1981 Canada Cup and 1977 and 1981 World Championships.

Career statistics

Regular season and playoffs

International

Awards and honors

References

External links

Miller's Hockeydraftcentral.com bio

1954 births
Living people
American men's ice hockey forwards
Calgary Cowboys players
Edmonton Oilers (WHA) players
Hartford Whalers players
Ice hockey people from Saint Paul, Minnesota
Minnesota Golden Gophers men's ice hockey players
NCAA men's ice hockey national champions
New England Whalers draft picks
New England Whalers players
New York Rangers draft picks
New York Rangers players
Quebec Nordiques (WHA) players